The Middle Branch Grass River flows into the Grass River in Clare, New York. The Middle Branch Grass River and South Branch Grass River combine together here and become the Grass River.

References 

Rivers of St. Lawrence County, New York